Nurdin Bakari (born 6 July 1988) is a Tanzanian former footballer who played for the Tanzania national football team. He was a squad member for the 2004, 2005, 2008, 2009, 2010 and 2011 CECAFA Cups.

International career

International goals
Scores and results list Tanzania's goal tally first.

References

1988 births
Living people
Association football midfielders
Tanzanian footballers
Simba S.C. players
Young Africans S.C. players
Lipuli F.C. players
Tanzania international footballers
Tanzanian Premier League players
2009 African Nations Championship players
Tanzania A' international footballers